Sai Sai Kham Leng (also Sai Sai Kham Hlaing; born 10 April 1979) is a Burmese singer-songwriter, model, novelist, and actor of ethnic Shan descent. He is considered one of the most commercially successful male singer in the history of Burmese hip hop music.

In 2020, he was recognized  in Forbes Asia's 100 Digital Stars List which shows Asia-Pacific's most influential celebrities on social media.

Early life and education
Sai Sai Kham Leng was born on 10 April 1979 in Taunggyi, Shan state, Myanmar to Kham Leng and Cho Cho San Tun of an ethnic Shan aristocratic family. His great-grandfather Sao San Tun, Saopha of Mongpawn, was a signatory to the 1947 Panglong Agreement and one of nine senior government officials assassinated on 19 July 1947.

Sai Sai is the eldest son of four siblings, having two younger sisters and a younger brother. Soon after he was born, his parents moved to nearby Aungban for two years before moving back to Taunggyi. He graduated high school at B.E.H.S (1) Taunggyi in 1996. His parents divorced when he was in the 4th standard (4th grade). He was living in two homes soon after divorce but ended up with his father. He did not see his mother for another six years. Leng became a judo player in the eighth standard. He won district-level competitions in high school, and participated in national youth competitions in Yangon. He was admitted to Dagon University majoring English subject and graduated in 2003 and also graduated with the English language from Yangon University of Foreign Languages (Post-grad Diploma) in 2004.

Music career
In 1997, Sai Sai relocated to the capital city of Myanmar, Yangon to become a singer. He started out on his music career in 1998, while still a university student and starred in various karaoke music albums. At that time, hip hop was new to the Myanmar and not widely accepted yet by the public at large.

In 1999, Sai Sai started endeavoring to be able to produce and distribute a solo album. He launched his debut album Chocolate Yaung Yayge Einmet (Chocolate-Colored Ice Dreams) in 2000. Unfortunately, the album was a failure but that did not stop him to stand up and try again. The follow-up second album "Thangegyin Myar Swar" (Friends) was released in 2001 which turned out to be a success creating him a place to stand in Myanmar music industry.

In 2003, Sai Sai released his third album "February Mhat Tann". One of the songs from that album named "One Nal Mhat Tan" hit the number one slot in the country. Other hit singles followed and the album was a commercial success. Sai became a household name, with hits such as Thu Nge Chin Myar Swar, February Mhattan (February Diary), Ever Golli and Happy Sai Sai Birthday. In 2004, Ba Sai cemented his position with the release of his album "Sai Sai Live in Yangon" which spawned more hits.

Sai Sai embarked on his first solo concert "Sai Sai Live" in 2004 followed by 'Sai Sai Birthday Show' an outdoor concert, on 10 April 2004 every year, gaining thousands of ticket sales which is currently the highest number in Myanmar music industry. The popular concert has since become an annual affair and gaining thousands of ticket sales which is a large number in Myanmar. Beyond performing, Sai runs Frenzo Music Production and spends time writing, composing and producing new music as well as directing music videos.

In 2005, Sai Sai released album "Sai Sai Hu Khaw Thi" (It is Called Sai Sai) and the follow-up albums "Happy Sai Sai Birthday" was released in 2007, "Ever Golli" (Always Dwifter) was released in 2009, "Date Date Kye" (Topnotch) was released in 2012. In 2013, Sai performed in the opening and closing ceremonies of the 2013 Southeast Asian Games as home country.

On 1 April 2019, Frenzo released an animation music video for "Nga Yee Zar Ka Po Mite Tal" (My girlfriend is better than yours) collaborating with Frenzo artists Sai Sai Kham Leng, Nay Win, Phyo Lay, Bunny Phyoe, Ki Ki Kyaw Zaw, John and G Fatt, which is one of the tracks in Sai Sai Kham Leng's album "Sai Sai is Sai Sai", was released on 1 April 2018. The music video became widely popular since the day released it on Sai Sai Kham Leng's official Facebook page and YouTube channel, and was praised for the animation quality and music video created by Pencell Studio. That music video was earned 1 M views within 24 hours and then 2 M views in 7 days.

Sai Sai was invited to attend and perform  at ASEAN-Japan Music Festival, which was organised  to foster friendship and co-operation between the countries, three times (2013,2018 and 2019).

Acting career
Sai Sai moved to Yangon in 1997 and joined John Lwin's John International Modeling Agency. He then participated in TV commercials as a model.

Sai Sai has acted in over 50 direct-to-videos in his early acting career. In 2006, he took on his first big-screen role in the film "Mingalabar". He then starred in his second big-screen film "Gon Shane Pyin Tat Chit Chin Thate Khar" where he played the main role with Yan Aung, Thet Mon Myint and Htun Eaindra Bo in 2007.

In 2008, Sai Sai took on his first big-screen leading role in the film "Yin Khon Hninsi" alongside Kyaw Thu, Moht Moht Myint Aung, and Thet Mon Myint which screened in Myanmar cinemas in 2008.

In 2011, Sai Sai portrayed the male lead in the drama film Adam, Eve and Datsa, alongside Thet Mon Myint and Pyay Ti Oo, directed by Wyne which premiered in Myanmar cinemas on 1 July 2011, and also screened in Singapore on 4 September 2011 and Los Angeles on 19 and 20 November 2011.

In 2015, he starred in the romantic-drama film Slaves of Cupid where he played the leading role with Phway Phway and Nay Toe which premiered in Myanmar cinemas on 28 August 2015. The film which was a commercial hit nationally, becoming the most watched film at that time. Sai's portrayal of the character earned praised by fans for his acting performance and character interpretation, and experienced a resurgence of popularity.

In 2016, he starred a leading role in the film Angel of Eden alongside Paing Phyo Thu, Mya Hnin Yee Lwin, May Grace Parry and Wint Yamone Naing. He then starred in the film Thingyan Pyatike where he played the leading role with Khin Wint Wah, and directed by Maung Myo Min (Yin Twin Phit) which premiered in Myanmar cinemas on 1 April 2016. The same year, he starred as the male lead in the Thai-Burmese film From Bangkok to Mandalay which earned his a nomination for the Thailand National Film Association Awards for Best Actor of 2017. The film premiered in Myanmar cinemas on 27 October 2016 and also screened in Thailand on 10 November 2016.

Collaborations 
Sai Sai collaborated with local hip-hop artist Bobby Soxer and Coca-Cola Myanmar to launch a song for the 2014 FIFA World Cup campaign, "The World is Ours". 
He worked on a collaboration project with Park Bom (Former 2NE1 member) for a song named "Red Light". Korean-English Version was released on 21 December 2020. On the next day, Myanmar-Korean version was released.

Brand ambassadorships
In 2013, Sai Sai started working as brand ambassador for Coca-Cola in Myanmar. He starred in Coca-Cola's 'Brrr' local television commercial together with singer and fellow ambassador Bobby Soxer. As part of Coca-Cola's 'Open Happiness' campaign to promote the launch of the new 425ml bottle in Myanmar, Sai Sai and Bobby produced the song 'Refreshing Days' in collaboration with the brand.

On 7 September 2013, Sai Sai was appointed as brand ambassador for the global chain of fast-food restaurants in East Asia Lotteria in Myanmar.

In 2014, Sai Sai was appointed as brand ambassador for Dongfeng Motor. He was appointed as brand ambassador for Honda Motorcycles and Samsung Mobile in Myanmar at the same year.

In 2015, Sai Sai was appointed as brand ambassador for WeChat Myanmar, BRAND'S Myanmar, and also became ambassador for mJams Music Store in 2016.

On 11 December 2016, Sai Sai was appointed as brand ambassador for watch brand Casio Edifice in Myanmar. Later, he became the brand ambassador for watch brand G-Shock Myanmar in 2017.

In 2018, Sai Sai became the brand ambassador for the Japanese men's grooming brand GATSBY. Also became the brand ambassador for the world leading company in the digital payment business, VISA on 12 March 2019.

Sai Sai was selected as the first ever South East Asian Artist to release Celebrity VISA Card. It was a collaboration between AYA Bank and VISA.

Business
In 2016, Sai established a trading company called Frenzo Myanmar Company Limited. After that, he launched a new cosmetic series called SAI Cosmetix under that trading company, as he possesses a strong fanbase in Myanmar and most of his fans are girls and ladies of all ages. The products he offers are mainly manufactured in South Korea. He launched three new shades of an Ultra Matte lipstick series; Crush on You, Marry Me, and Xo Xo in October 2016, and "Love is in the Air" mascara.

Humanitarian work
In 2015, Sai Sai was involved in the National Tuberculosis Programme (NTP) Cover Your Cough Campaign, which aimed to increase knowledge about how tuberculosis spreads. In 2016, he continued his advocacy in this area with the Myanmar Unite to End TB Mass Media Programme with the NTP, supported by The 3MDG Fund.

During COVID-19 pandemic, Sai Sai enthusiastically collaborated with Ministry of Health and Sports (Myanmar) to promote awareness and preventive guidelines using his social  influence. On April 10, 2020, he celebrated his 16th Birthday Show, SAI SAI BIRTHDAY SHOW IN BEDROOM, from his own house in compliance with social distancing and Stay-At-Home guidelines. The Live Show was broadcast free and raised  hundreds of millions kyats for funding to manage the pandemic across Myanmar.

Political criticism
In the aftermath of the 2021 Myanmar coup d'état, he stayed relatively low profile. On February 2, one day after the coup, Sai Sai Kham Leng had changed his profile image to a red square, the colour of the NLD, and posted that he hoped everyone was "safe and sound". He showed his support for the peaceful protests  and  voice out to respect the votes cast during 2020 elections and to free the previously detained artists on his official social media accounts. He also joined several protests alongside other  famous musicians from Myanmar Music Association in late February. Nevertheless, public opinions turned against him and their perception of him doing not enough for the cause, he became a target of social punishment movements.

Personal life
His relationship with actress Wut Hmone Shwe Yee was one of the most fascinating relationships amongst the Burmese celebrity world. However, they broke up after some years. Sai is single and lives in Yangon. He expressed that he was unsure about marriage as he comes from a "broken family". He is a Theravada Buddhist.

Discography

Studio albums
 Chocolate Yaung Yayge Einmet (Chocolate-coloured Icy Dream) (2000)
 Thangegyin Mya Zwa (Many Friends) (2001)
 February Mhattan (February Diary) (2003)
 Sai Sai Live in Yangon (2004)
 Sai Sai Hu Khaw Thi (It is Called Sai Sai) (2005)
 Happy Sai Sai Birthday (2007)
 Ever Golli (Always Dwifter) (2009)
 Date Date Kye (Topnotch) (2012)
 "Sai Sai is Sai Sai" (2018)

Collaborative albums
 Pyan Pyaw Pya Bo Tawtaw Khet Leit Me (Would Be Quite Difficult to tell) (2002)
 Meinma (Woman) (2002)
 A-Chit Mya Zwa A Twet (For All My Love) (2002)
 Bawa Bawa (Life Life) (2003)
 City FM 2nd Anniversary (2003)
 Natthami Ponbyin (Fairy Tale) (2004)
 Rock & Rap Live Show (2006)
 A-Lwan Ye Nya (Night of Missing) (2006)
 A Yin Lo Seit Ma Cha Lo Ba Shin (Because I Can't Trust Anymore Like Before) (2006)
 Angel (2006)
 10 Seconds (2007)
 City FM 6th Anniversary (2007)
 City FM 7th Anniversary (2008)
 City FM 10th Anniversary (2011)

Single albums
 Red Light (Featuring Park Bom) (2020)

Tours

2004: First Sai Sai Solo Concert (Strand Hotel) 
2004 to present: Concerts held every year on 10 April for Sai Sai Birthday
2014: 10th Concert
2016: 12th Concert in 2016
2016: Frenzo Music Tour with Ve Ve (Myanmar)

Filmography

Film (Cinema)
Mingalabar (2006)
Gon Shein Pyin Tae Chit Chin Thake Khar (2006)
 Yin Khon Hninsi (2008) 
 Adam, Eve and Datsa (2011)
 12 Kyoe Ka Way (2012)
 Slaves of Cupid (2015)
 Angel of Eden (2016)
 Thingyan Museum (2016)
 From Bangkok to Mandalay (2016)
Jone Jone Jat Jat (2017)
Cho Myain Thaw Let Sar Chay Chin (2017)
Yee Sar Ta Won Kwal (2018)
Kyar Tot The Lal Maung Sakar (2019)
 Padauk Musical (2020)

Novels
 Sekk-ku Nget (Paper Crane)
 Kan Ko Swel Ywe Hmone Thi Chel..Min Yay Kywl Ei Ma Kyal Ei (We Draw Life By Fortune .. Maybe Bold or not)

Awards and nominations

Film

Local Music Awards

World Music Awards
The World Music Awards is an international awards show founded in 1989 that annually honors recording artists based on worldwide sales figures provided by the International Federation of the Phonographic Industry (IFPI). Sai has three nominations from World Music Awards.

! scope="col" |
|-
| rowspan="3"valign="center"|2014
| rowspan="3" align="center"|N/A
| align="center"|World's Best Male Artist
|
| rowspan="3" align="center"|
|-
| align="center"|World's Best Live Act
|
|-
| align="center"|World's Best Entertainer of the Year
|
|-

References

External links

Sai Sai Fan Club
Sai Sai MP3 Download Site

1979 births
21st-century Burmese male actors
21st-century Burmese male singers
Burmese novelists
Burmese people of Shan descent
Burmese singer-songwriters
Burmese Theravada Buddhists
Living people
Male rappers
Burmese rappers
People from Taunggyi